In Roman law, res derelictae referred to property voluntarily abandoned by the owner. The dominant strand of legal thought under the Roman Empire held it to be a form of res nullius, or "un-owned" property, but it was necessary to establish that it had been voluntarily abandoned. The opposite was res mancipi, or "owned" property.

See also
 Res communis
 Sicaricon

References

Roman law